Danny Drake (born 25 March 1995) is a New Zealand rugby union player who last played for the Scarlets in the Pro14 competition.  His position of choice is lock.

References

External links 
itsrugby.co.uk profile

New Zealand rugby union players
Living people
Scarlets players
1995 births
Rugby union locks
North Harbour rugby union players
Gloucester Rugby players
Doncaster Knights players
Rugby union players from London